James W. Oliver (c. 1844 in New York City – September 18, 1911 in Manhattan, NYC) was an American lawyer and politician from New York.

Life
He graduated from St. John's College. Then he studied law, was admitted to the bar, and practiced in New York City.

Oliver was a member of the New York State Assembly in 1884, 1885, 1898, 1906, 1907, 1908, 1909, 1910 and 1911; and was Minority Leader in 1907.

He died on September 18, 1911, in St. Vincent's Hospital in Manhattan; and was buried at the Calvary Cemetery in Queens.

Sources
 Official New York from Cleveland to Hughes by Charles Elliott Fitch (Hurd Publishing Co., New York and Buffalo, 1911, Vol. IV; pg. 317, 319, 339, 352, 354f, 357 and 359f)
 EX-ASSEMBLYMAN OLIVER HURT in NYT on November 3, 1899
 JAMES W. OLIVER, ASSEMBLYMAN, DIES in NYT on September 19, 1911
 FUNERAL OF JAMES W. OLIVER in NYT on September 22, 1911

1844 births
1911 deaths
People from Manhattan
Democratic Party members of the New York State Assembly
St. John's University (New York City) alumni
Burials at Calvary Cemetery (Queens)
19th-century American politicians